O Desejado (also known as O Desejado ou As Montanhas da Lua and Mountains Of The Moon) is a 1987  Portuguese-French drama film  written and directed by Paulo Rocha and starring Luís Miguel Cintra.

The film was entered into the main competition at the 44th edition of the Venice Film Festival. The production of the film, and the experience of Yves Afonso, a French actor of Portuguese descent who first visited Portugal because of this film, later inspired Voyage to the Beginning of the World by Manoel de Oliveira.

Plot

Cast  
 
  Luís Miguel Cintra as João
  Caroline Chaniolleau as Antonia
  Yves Afonso as Laurentino
  Jacques Bonnaffé as Tiago
  Manuela de Freitas as Isabel 
  Isabel Ruth as  Virginia 
  Isabel de Castro as  Housekeeper

References

External links

1987 drama films
1987 films
Films directed by Paulo Rocha
Portuguese drama films
French drama films
Works based on The Tale of Genji
1980s French films